The Proto-Kartvelian language, or Common Kartvelian, is the linguistic reconstruction of the common ancestor of the Kartvelian languages, which was spoken by the ancestors of the modern Kartvelian peoples. The existence of such a language is widely accepted by specialists in linguistics, who have reconstructed a broad outline of the language by comparing the existing Kartvelian languages against each other.
Several linguists, namely, Gerhard Deeters and Georgy Klimov have also reconstructed a lower-level proto-language called Proto-Karto-Zan or Proto-Georgian-Zan, which is the ancestor of Karto-Zan languages (includes Georgian and Zan).

Influences

The ablaut patterns of Proto-Kartvelian are highly similar to those of the Indo-European languages, and so it is thought that Proto-Kartvelian interacted with Indo-European at a relatively early date. This is reinforced by words borrowed from Indo-European, such as the Proto-Kartvelian *mḳerd- (breast), and its possible relation to the Proto-Indo-European *ḱerd- (heart). Proto-Kartvelian *ṭep- (warm) may also be directly derived from Proto-Indo-European *tep- "warm".

Relation to descendants
The modern descendants of Proto-Kartvelian are Georgian, Svan, Mingrelian and Laz. The ablaut patterns of Proto-Kartvelian were better preserved in Georgian and (particularly) Svan than in either Mingrelian or Laz, in which new forms have been set up so that there is a single, stable vowel in each word element.

The system of pronouns of Proto-Kartvelian is distinct on account of its category of inclusive–exclusive (so, for instance, there were two forms of the pronoun "we": one that includes the listener and one that does not). This has survived in Svan but not in the other languages. Svan also includes a number of archaisms from the Proto-Kartvelian era, and therefore it is thought that Svan broke off from Proto-Kartvelian at a relatively early stage: the later Proto-Kartvelian stage (called Karto-Zan) split into Georgian and Zan (Mingrelo-Laz).

Phonology

Vowels

Consonants

Distinction between plain q and ejective q' remains only in Svan language. This distinction also existed in Old Georgian.

Notes

References
Encyclopædia Britannica, 15th edition (1986): Macropedia, "Languages of the World", see section titled "Caucasian languages".

Gamkrelidze, Th. (1966) "A Typology of Common Kartvelian", Language, Vol. 42, No. 1 (Jan. – Mar.), pp. 69–83

Agglutinative languages
Kartvelian language
Proto-Kartvelian language